Rik (also Romanized as Rīk; also known as Reg, Rek, and Rīg) is a village in Tula Rud Rural District, in the Central District of Talesh County, Gilan Province, Iran. At the 2006 census, its population was 1,565, in 336 families.

References 

Populated places in Talesh County